This is a list of programs broadcast by One Sports (formerly AksyonTV and 5 Plus), a broadcasting network in the Philippines owned by Cignal TV and Nation Broadcasting Corporation. The network's program lineup consists of extreme sports, collegiate sports, e-sports, sports entertainment, etc. Occasionally as time permits, One Sports may take on the responsibility of airing sports programs produced by One Sports division in the event that TV5 is unable to carry them due to breaking news or any special programming.

For previously aired defunct shows of the former AksyonTV and 5 Plus, see List of programs aired by AksyonTV/5 Plus.

Current original programming

Sports
University Athletic Association of the Philippines

Basketball
Maharlika Pilipinas Basketball League  
PBA Developmental League 
Philippine Basketball Association 
PBA 3x3

Boxing
Manny Pacquiao Presents: Blow By Blow

Football
Philam Life 7s Football League 
The Azkals matches

Volleyball
Spikers' Turf 
Premier Volleyball League

Public affairs
 The Chiefs (2023; also broadcast on One News)

Sports newscasts
The Game

Sports-oriented programs
Hotseat

Cockfighting
Bakbakan Na 
Sabong TV 
Sagupaan  
Thunderbird Sabong Nation 
Tukaan

Religious
Family TV Mass

Current acquired programming

Auto racing
Super GT (2022 season)

Basketball
National Basketball Association

Mixed martial arts
ONE Championship

Wrestling
WWE Raw 
WWE SmackDown

See also
 TV5
 One Sports (sports division)
 One Sports (TV channel)
 PBA Rush

References

External links
5 Plus official website

One Sports